Bulatovo (Bulat) is a rural locality (a village) in Sanninsky Selsoviet, Blagoveshchensky District, Bashkortostan, Russia. The population was 53 as of 2010. There are 2 streets.

Geography 
Bulatovo is located 41 km north of Blagoveshchensk (the district's administrative centre) by road. Sanninskoye is the nearest rural locality.

References 

Rural localities in Blagoveshchensky District